was a Japanese designer of ukiyo-e style Japanese woodblock prints, who was active from about 1783 to about 1795.

Although a student of Katsukawa Shunshō, Shunchō's output, which consists mostly of prints of beautiful women, more closely resembles the work of Torii Kiyonaga.

Shunchō also designed many shunga prints, which also resemble those of Torii Kiyonaga.

His work is held in the permanent collections of many museums worldwide, including the British Museum, the Portland Art Museum, the University of Michigan Museum of Art, the Nelson-Atkins Museum of Art, the Reading Public Museum, the Gregory Allicar Museum of Art, the Harvard Art Museums, the Minneapolis Institute of Art, the Mead Art Museum at Amherst College, the Hyde Collection, the MOA Museum of Art, the Indianapolis Museum of Art, the Brooklyn Museum, the Suntory Museum of Art, and the Metropolitan Museum of Art.

Gallery

Notes

References
 Hayashi, Yoshikazu, Kiyonaga to Shunchō, Tokyo, Yuko Shobo, 1976, 135–6.
 Keyes, Roger S. & Keiko Mizushima, The Theatrical World of Osaka Prints, Philadelphia, Philadelphia Museum of Art, 1973, 275.
 Lane, Richard. (1978).  Images from the Floating World, The Japanese Print. Oxford: Oxford University Press. ;  OCLC 5246796
 Newland, Amy Reigle. (2005). Hotei Encyclopedia of Japanese Woodblock Prints.  Amsterdam: Hotei. ;  OCLC 61666175

External links
Bridge of dreams: the Mary Griggs Burke collection of Japanese art, a catalog from The Metropolitan Museum of Art Libraries (fully available online as PDF), which contains material on Katsukawa Shunchō (see index)

18th-century Japanese artists
Katsukawa school
Ukiyo-e artists
Year of birth unknown
Year of death unknown
18th-century printmakers